National Route 213 is a national highway of Japan connecting Beppu, Ōita and Nakatsu, Ōita in Japan, with a total length of 124.8 km (77.55 mi).

References

National highways in Japan
Roads in Ōita Prefecture